The Médaille du Cercle National des Armées de Terre, Air et Mer (Medal of the National Circle of the Armies of Land Air and Sea) is a military decoration of the French Republic.

Description

The medal is circular, silvered metal with eyelet for suspending it from a ribbon.  The face of the medal is a view in relief of the Circle’s building on the Place Saint-Augustin in Paris.  The medal's face is inscribed ‘CERCLE NATIONAL DES ARMEES’ above and ‘TERRE AIR MER’ below.  The inscription is contained within a border of devices with an upright sword, crossed anchors and outstretched wings for the three armed services.  The reverse of the medal contains the logo of the Circle.

The medal is suspended on a recent ribbon in the French national colors of red, white and blue.

The Cercle Nationale is the French military's select professional association.  Foreigners who have contributed to improved relations between their countries and France's military are also eligible for membership.  It has its origins in the Order in Council of February 5, 1887, in which President Jules Grévy and the government of France's Third Republuc sought to create a professional officer corps that was not tied to the monarchist Second French Empire.  The French law of April 16, 1924 authorized the Cercle Nationale's establishment on the site of the former La Pépinière Barracks, a new building designed by Charles Lemaresquier.

References

External links
 Paris Convention and Visitors Bureau, Cercle National des Armées, retrieved July 23, 2014
 Michael Belis, 1-22 Infantry.org, John M. A. Palmer, Commanding Officer 22nd Infantry, June 11, 1920 - May 5, 1921, retrieved July 23, 2014
  C. Langston Craig, Library of Congress, John McAuley Palmer Papers: Artifact, 1917, page 10, retrieved July 23, 2014

Military awards and decorations of France
Awards established in 1887
1887 establishments in France